Kuusankosken Kumu was a football club established in 1964 from Kuusankoski, Finland. The club played one season in the Finnish premier division Veikkausliiga in 1990.

Kumu was dissolved in 1992 due to financial problems and a new club FC Kumu was formed in 1993. FC Kumu merged with Pallo-Peikot in 1996 and the two clubs are known today as FC Kuusankoski.

Season to season 

1 seasons in Veikkausliiga
3 seasons in Ykkönen
13 seasons in Kakkonen
10 seasons in Kolmonen

References 

Football clubs in Finland
Association football clubs established in 1964
Association football clubs disestablished in 1992